is a railway station on the Kishin Line in the city of Niimi, Okayama Prefecture, Japan, operated by West Japan Railway Company (JR West).

Lines
Osakabe Station is served by the Kishin Line.

Adjacent stations

Railway stations in Okayama Prefecture